Atenery Hernández Martín (born 10 December 1994 un San Cristóbal de La Laguna, Tenerife) is a Spanish weightlifter, competing in the 53 kg category and representing Spain at international competitions.

She competed at world championships, including at the 2015 World Weightlifting Championships.

She won the silver medal in the women's 49 kg Snatch and Clean & Jerk events at the 2022 Mediterranean Games held in Oran, Algeria.

Major results

References

External links
 
 
 
 
 
 http://www.the-sports.org/atenery-hernandez-martin-weightlifting-spf221162.html
 http://www.marca.com/2015/04/12/mas_deportes/otros_deportes/1428854411.html
 http://www.larazon.es/deportes/atenery-hernandez-esto-no-es-de-brutos-cuenta-la-tecnica-DC11313374
 http://web.eldia.es/deportes/2016-12-05/103-tinerfena-Atenery-Hernandez-busca-medalla-oro-Israel.htm
 http://www.wangconnection.com/buena-actuacion-de-atenery-hernandez-en-el-mundial-de-halterofilia/

1994 births
Living people
Spanish female weightlifters
Place of birth missing (living people)
Weightlifters at the 2010 Summer Youth Olympics
People from San Cristóbal de La Laguna
Sportspeople from the Province of Santa Cruz de Tenerife
Mediterranean Games silver medalists for Spain
Mediterranean Games medalists in weightlifting
Competitors at the 2018 Mediterranean Games
Competitors at the 2022 Mediterranean Games
European Weightlifting Championships medalists
21st-century Spanish women